House of Councillors elections were held in Japan in 1995.

Because of the circumstances of its creation, the opposition party New Frontier Party held seats in the House of Councillors without having won them in the prior election. Many of them were former members of the LDP.

The elections was historic in that the New Frontier Party replaced the Japanese Socialist Party, which had been the largest opposition party for 38 years, and entered coalition with the Liberal Democratic Party. The Socialists lost many seats in this election.

Results

By constituency

References

Japan
1995 elections in Japan
House of Councillors (Japan) elections
July 1995 events in Asia
Election and referendum articles with incomplete results